The southern pygmy perch (Nannoperca australis), also known as the Tasmanian pygmy perch, is a species of freshwater ray-finned fish, a temperate perch from the family Percichthyidae which is native to southeastern Australia and Tasmania.

Description
The southern pygmy perch has an oblong and moderately compressed body with a convex dorsal profile and a straight ventral profile. It has a large head the top of which bulges slightly and a blunt snout. It has a slightly oblique, terminal mouth which is protractile with the maxilla reaching to a level near the centre of the eye. There are thin bands of villiform teeth on the jaws and the roof of the mouth. There is a lateral line made up of an irregular series of pored scales. The dorsal fin has 7-9 spines in its front part, separated from the rear part by a deep notch, the rear part contains 7-10 soft rays. The anal fin is similar in shape to the soft part of the dorsal fin and has 3 spines and 7-8 soft rays. The  large caudal fin is rounded. They are variable in colour, the colour apparently being determined by their environment and can be pale cream through to greenish-brown, with paler underparts. They can also show irregular markings on the flanks such as dark spotting or horizontal stripes. In the breeding season the males are brighter as their dorsal, anal and caudal fins develop a red colour and have black margins and the pelvic fins and the area around the anus become black.

Distribution
Southern pygmy perch are endemic to temperate rivers systems in southeastern Australia, especially the Murray-Murrumbidgee river system from Brinagagee bear Darlington Point in New South Wales, in Victoria (Australia) west to Ewens Ponds in South Australia. They also occur on Flinders Island and on King Island in the Bass Strait and in the northward draining rivers in Tasmania.

Habitat and biology
Southern pygmy perch are found in a wide variety of freshwater habitats so long as they have aquatic vegetation. They can be found in both still or slow flowing waters and they have been recorded in low current streams, lakes, billabongs, ditches, impoundments, swamps and ephemeral wetlands. In all of these habitat they prefer the vegetated marginal areas. It is a mainly carnivorous species with its diet mostly consisting of small invertebrates such as mosquito larvae and other aquatic insects, as well as Daphnia and other crustaceans. As they mature they prey on larger insects including mayflies but their small mouth means that they do not consume many other fishes. The breeding season runs from the late winter into the early spring once the water temperatures rise above . Breeding males are territorial and defend a small area of water from other males. The female lays small clutches of eggs in the aquatic vegetation or onto the riverbed within the male's territory. These hatch into larvae of 3-4mm in length 2-4 days after fertilisation.

Conservation
The Southern pygmy perch was formerly widespread in New South Wales but has now largely been extirpated from the State, there are only three known locations where it can still be found. It is still common in coastal Victoria but it is rare in the Murray catchment of that state and it is rare and threatened in South Australia. In Tasmania it remains relatively common. The reasons for the decline and continuing threats to this species includes invasive alien fish such as brown trout, Gambusia and European perch as well as habitat fragmentation and destruction The IUCN assessed the conservation status of this species as Near Threatened in 2019. The Department of Primary Industries in New South Wales has undertaken a captive breeding programme for this species.

Taxonomy
The Southern pygmy perch was first formally described in 1861 by Albert Günther with the type locality given as the Murray River. 
Molecular studies have shown that there are two cryptic species within Nannoperca australis one from the eastern coastal streams and the other from the Murray–Darling basin and the western coastal streams.

Aquarium
The Southern pygmy perch is in the aquarium trade within Australia where it is kept in cold water aquaria and in ponds.

References

External links
Southern Pygmy Perch

Nannoperca
Freshwater fish of Australia
Fish described in 1861
Taxa named by Albert Günther